The Austin Marathon (also known as Ascension Seton Austin Marathon presented by Under Armour for sponsorship reasons) is an annual marathon held in Austin, Texas, since 1992. The race weekend also features a half marathon and a 5K run with a two-day expo taking place on Friday and Saturday. The 32nd annual event is scheduled to take place on February 18, 2024.

The race begins at 7:00 in the morning and features a highly competitive elite field.  It is livestreamed by FloSports.  Participants typically include runners from all 50 U.S. states and about 35 countries.

History 

It was founded in 1991 by Motorola, who served as title sponsor for fifteen years.

To properly mark the event's 30th anniversary with a running of the full marathon, anniversary celebrations would be extended to 2022.

Course 

The Austin Marathon and Austin Half Marathon both start at 2nd St. and Congress Avenue. The course goes by Austin landmarks and areas, like downtown, the Colorado River, SoCo, historic Hyde Park, East Austin, and the University of Texas at Austin campus and tower. Bands perform live music along the race route in a tribute to Austin's label as The Live Music Capital of the World. The race ends near where it begins at 9th and Congress Ave. in front of the picturesque Texas State Capitol. The course is USATF-certified.

The course that debuted in 2018 was designed to provide a better participant and spectator experience and allow enhanced traffic flow along the course, while still finishing with the picturesque Texas State Capitol as every runner’s backdrop. The first half of the Austin Marathon was not changed. After Mile 12, half marathoners head south to the finish line, while marathoners continue east before turning north and running on Guadalupe St. through the heart of the University of Texas campus.

Other races 

In addition to the marathon held on Sunday, the Austin Marathon weekend features a free official shakeout run on Saturday morning since 2022 (previously Friday) at Fleet Feet Austin. Also on Sunday morning, the half marathon and KXAN SimpleHealth 5K benefitting Paramount Theatre start at the same location as the marathon on 2nd and Congress. The 5K starts 30–45 minutes later and is an out and back course while the marathon and half marathon finishes on 9th and Congress.

The event featured the Manzano Mile presented by Dole on the Saturday morning before the marathon in 2018-2020 taking place just outside the expo site on Riverside Drive. The 2021 race was scheduled to take place the same morning as the other races but later became a virtual race, where participants run the distance on their own schedule and submit their time online. A mile race did not take place during the 2022 marathon weekend.

Community impact 

Austin Gives Miles, the marathon's official charity program, raised $702,500 in 2020. The 25 Central Texas nonprofit organizations accepted into the program worked to exceed the program’s fundraising goal while increasing awareness of their organization and recruiting race day volunteers. Since 2014, Austin Gives Miles has raised $3.8 million for Central Texas nonprofit organizations. In 2019, Moody Foundation became presenting sponsor for Austin Gives Miles. Since 2015, Austin Gives Miles has been a Moody Foundation grant recipient. During this time, their total contributions have reached $1.2 million.

The Austin Marathon injected $48.5 million into the Austin economy during the 2019 race weekend. 2019's economic impact on the City of Austin is a $11 million (23 percent) increase from the 2018 event.

Sponsorship 

Marathon founder Motorola served as the marathon's title sponsor for fifteen years.

The marathon was sponsored by AT&T in 2007 and 2008, but ran with no title sponsor in 2009. From 2010 to 2013, the race was called the LIVESTRONG Austin Marathon. Freescale returned as presenting sponsor in 2014 and 2015. NXP Semiconductors and Freescale completed their merger in December 2015, with NXP becoming the presenting sponsor for 2016 and 2017. Under Armour was the presenting sponsor of the 2018 Austin Marathon, but had no title sponsor. In 2019, an agreement was reached naming Ascension Seton the title sponsor. Under Armour also returned as presenting sponsor for the 2019 Austin Marathon. KXAN-TV became title sponsor of the KXAN SimpleHealth 5K benefitting Paramount Theatre in 2019. Both Ascension Seton (title) and Under Armour (presenting) will return as sponsors for the 2022 Austin Marathon. KXAN will return as title sponsor for the 2022 KXAN SimpleHealth 5K.

Winners 

Key: Course record (in bold)

Notes

References

External links

Marathon Info
That Other Paper story by a 2007 Austin Marathon runner

Recurring sporting events established in 1992
Marathons in the United States
Marathon
1992 establishments in Texas